Canada has several monuments and memorials that to varying degrees commemorate people and groups accused of collaboration with Nazi forces. 

Monuments and memorials include or have included a statue of Draža Mihailović in Ontario, three monuments in Ontario and Alberta connected with the Waffen-SS, streets and parks named after Alexis Carrel and Philipp Lenard, a mountain named after Philippe Pétain, and two streets named after a commander of Nazi German forces and his ship. There are three monuments to members of the 14th Waffen Grenadier Division of the SS (1st Galician). These monuments are controversial, with leaders of the Canadian Ukrainian community rejecting the links to the Nazi regime.

French

Mount Pétain 
A mountain on the border of British Columbia and Alberta was named for Nazi Collaborator Philippe Pétain until British Columbia removed its name in 2022 following Alberta's decision to remove mountain's name in 2019. It was named in 1919 after Pétain, who at that time was recognized as a hero for leading forces to victory in the 1916 Battle of Verdun in World War I. Later, during World War II, Pétain led the collaborationist Government of Vichy France.

Streets and Parks named after Alexis Carrel 
In 2015 CTV News reported that in Quebec a street in Gatineau was named after Alexis Carrel, as well a street and park named after him in 1972 and 1988 respectively in Montreal community Rivière des Prairies, and a park and streets named after him in Boisbriand and Châteauguay. Carrel won the Nobel Prize in Medicine in 1912, and was a supporter of eugenics and the Nazis, advocating for the elimination of "undesirables", and was involved in the Vichy government of France. In 2015 the street in Gatineau was renamed after Marie Curie. In 2017 it was announced that the street and the park in Rivière des Prairies, Montreal would be renamed. This followed a campaign from the Centre for Israel and Jewish Affairs of Quebec, who said that they hoped Boisbriand and Châteauguay would follow the lead of Montreal and Gatineau.

Serbian

Draža Mihailović statue, Hamilton 
There is a statue in Hamilton, Ontario of Draža Mihailović, a Yugoslav Serb general during World War II. He was the leader of the Chetniks, a royalist and Serbian nationalist movement and guerrilla force, who collaborated with the Nazis following the German invasion of Yugoslavia in 1941.

Ukrainian
The International Military Tribunal's verdict at the Nuremberg Trials declared the entire Waffen-SS a "criminal organization" guilty of war crimes. Monuments to members of the Ukrainian Waffen-SS have been vandalized by activists at differing times as "Nazi monuments", as have monuments to members of the Ukrainian Insurgent Army. Canadian police apologized in 2020 for originally stating that the anti-Nazi vandalism of those monuments is motivated by hate. Leaders of the Canadian Ukrainian community said the Ukrainian monuments are not related to Nazism.

Roman Shukhevych statue, Edmonton 

The bronze bust of Ukrainian Nationalist leader and Nazi collaborator, responsible for the ethnic cleansing of Poles and massacres of Jews, Roman Shukhevych was built in 1972 by Ukrainian World War II veterans on private land near the Ukrainian Youth Unity Complex in Edmonton, Alberta. The statue was vandalised in 2019 when someone added the words  "Nazi scum". It was vandalised again in 2021 when someone added the words "Actual Nazi" in red paint.

Memorial at St. Michael’s Cemetery, Edmonton 

A memorial reading: For those who fought for Ukraine’s Freedom was constructed in 1976 by the former Ukrainian Waffen-SS in St. Michael’s Cemetery in Edmonton was vandalized by painting "Nazi monument to 14th Waffen SS". According to the Friends of Simon Wiesenthal Center, such a painting reflects the actual historical record of people commemorated by the monument. Jewish organizations requested the removal of the damaged memorial. However, the Ukrainian Catholic Church called the vandalism "part of the decades-long Russian disinformation campaign against Ukraine and Ukrainians to create a false Nazi image of Ukrainian freedom fighters." The St. Michael’s monument is dedicated to "Fighters for the Freedom of Ukraine". One of its plaques is an abbreviation for the First Division Division of the Ukrainian National Army. On April 25, 1945, the Waffen-SS Galizien was officially reorganized as the First Division of the Ukrainian National Army, and swore a new oath of loyalty to the Ukrainian people. Bernie Farber of the Canadian Jewish Congress wrote that "removing this monument will require the Ukrainian-Canadian community to take a hard look at its own history." University of Alberta historian Jars Balan told CBC News that the history of the monument and the Shukhevych statue were "complicated", saying that some people had fought in German uniforms in order to achieve Ukrainian independence.

Memorial at St. Volodymyr Ukrainian Cemetery, Oakville 

The granite Ukrainian Insurgent Army memorial entitled Pamiatnyk Slavy UPA (English: Monument to the Glory of the UPA) was inaugurated on May 26, 1988, in the St. Volodymyr Ukrainian Cemetery in Oakville, Ontario. There is also a monument to veterans of the 14th Waffen Grenadier Division of the SS (1st Galician), a military branch of the Nazi Party Waffen-SS. The SS division's insignia was added to the memorial soon after inauguration. The memorial was vandalised in mid-June 2022 when someone added the words "Nazi war monument".

The memorial was also the subject of complaints from the Russian Embassy to Canada in 2017. Ihor Michalchyshyn, the CEO of the Ukrainian Canadian Congress accused Russia of obfuscation.

Jewish B’nai Brith organization and the Canadian Polish Congress joined forces and called for the monument's removal by releasing a joint statement saying that the presence of monuments that whitewash the Holocaust and Nazi ideology is unacceptable in Canada.

Oakville Mayor Rob Burton stated that he would remove the monument but he can’t, because municipalities have no right to regulate private cemeteries.

German

Langsdorff Drive & Graf Spee Crescent 
The town of Ajax, Ontario is named for the HMS Ajax, which fought in the Battle of the River Plate in the Second World War. In the municipality, one of the streets was named Langsdorff Drive in honour of Hans Langsdorff, a battleship captain who commanded Nazi Germany forces in the battle. The naming was supported by the River Plate Veterans Association. The street received a naming ceremony, with Langsdorff's daughter and son-in-law in attendance.

This name was changed in 2021 in response to public opposition. In 2020 Ajax  tried to honour Langsdorff and his ship the Admiral Graf Spee by naming a street Graf Spee Crescent. This was also changed after the public became aware and brought it the attention of Ajax Mayor Shaun Collier. Collier put forward a motion to change this name, stating, "We did Langsdorff, which I did support ... This, I think, has crossed the line a little bit." Many of Ajax's streets are named after people involved in the Battle of the River Plate.

Philipp Lenard Street 
A street in Gatineau, Quebec, was named after Nobel Prize winner Philipp Lenard, who won the Nobel Prize in physics in 1905. He was also a strong supporter of the Nazis and acted as an advisor to Hitler. In 2015 the street was renamed after Albert Einstein following a campaign from the Centre for Israel and Jewish Affairs of Quebec.

See also 
 Monuments in the United States to Nazi collaborators
 List of Holocaust memorials and museums in Canada
 List of Holodomor memorials and monuments in Canada
 Monument of Lihula, Estonia
 Monuments to Stepan Bandera

References

External links 
 Owen Schalk, Why isn’t Canadian media condemning Nazi collaborator Roman Shukhevych?, Canadian Dimension, November 3 2022.
 Harrison Samphir, How did a monument to a Nazi SS division end up being erected in Canada?, The Georgia Straight, 25 July 2020.

Ukrainian Insurgent Army
World War II memorials in Canada
Statues in Canada
Controversies in Canada